Cirque Mountain is a  mountain summit located in Ouray County of southwest Colorado, United States. It is situated six miles west of the community of Ouray, above the north side of Yankee Boy Basin, on land managed by Uncompahgre National Forest. It is part of the Sneffels Range which is a subset of the San Juan Mountains, which in turn is part of the Rocky Mountains. Cirque ranks as the 155th-highest peak in Colorado, and the ninth-highest in the Sneffels Range. It is west of the Continental Divide, 1.12 mile east of Mount Sneffels, and 0.59 mile west of Teakettle Mountain, which is the nearest higher neighbor. These basins are cirques which were carved by ancient glaciers. The mountain's name has been officially adopted by the United States Board on Geographic Names.

Climate 
According to the Köppen climate classification system, Cirque Mountain is located in an alpine subarctic climate zone with long, cold, snowy winters, and cool to warm summers. Due to its altitude, it receives precipitation all year, as snow in winter, and as thunderstorms in summer, with a dry period in late spring. Precipitation runoff from the mountain drains into tributaries of the Uncompahgre River.

Gallery

See also

References

External links 

 Weather forecast: Cirque Mountain

Mountains of Ouray County, Colorado
San Juan Mountains (Colorado)
Mountains of Colorado
North American 4000 m summits
Uncompahgre National Forest